The St. Joseph's Polish Roman Catholic Church is a historic church at 517 E. 46th Avenue in Denver, Colorado.  It was built in 1902 and was added to the National Register of Historic Places in 1983.

It was expanded in 1923.

References

Roman Catholic churches in Denver
Polish-American history
Roman Catholic churches completed in 1902
National Register of Historic Places in Denver
Churches on the National Register of Historic Places in Colorado
Gothic Revival church buildings in Colorado
1902 establishments in Colorado
20th-century Roman Catholic church buildings in the United States